= Shanghai Wanfeng Auto Group =

Chinese automobile manufacturer

Shanghai Wanfeng Coach Manufacturing Co.
- Type: Co. Ltd.
- Industry: Automotive
- Founded: 1994
- Defunct: 2008
- Headquarters: Shanghai, People's Republic of China
- Area served: Mainland China
- Products: Automobiles

Shanghai Wanfeng Coach Manufacturing Co., Ltd. was a Chinese automobile manufacturer based in Pudong district of the city of Shanghai. The company produced cars from 2000 until 2008 when the company was closed.

== Company history ==
The company was founded in 1995. The headquarter was located in Pudong district of the city Shanghai. The preparation for the production of automobiles began in 2000 under the brand name, Wanfeng.In 2001 they started to make cars in a factory in Zhejiang Province. However, in 2008s, the company became defunct.

The year 2004 sales was the best for the company with 10,000 cars sold. After that sales declined fast and by 2005, only 4,000 cars were sold. By 2008 the company sold only 824 cars in the first five months and decided to cease the car making operation.

== Vehicles ==
Available vehicle products during the period were all-terrain vehicles and pick-ups with the model names as follows:

- Wanfeng Taiwei
- Wanfeng Suwei
- Wanfeng Suda
- Wanfeng Caiyou
- Wanfeng Fuyida
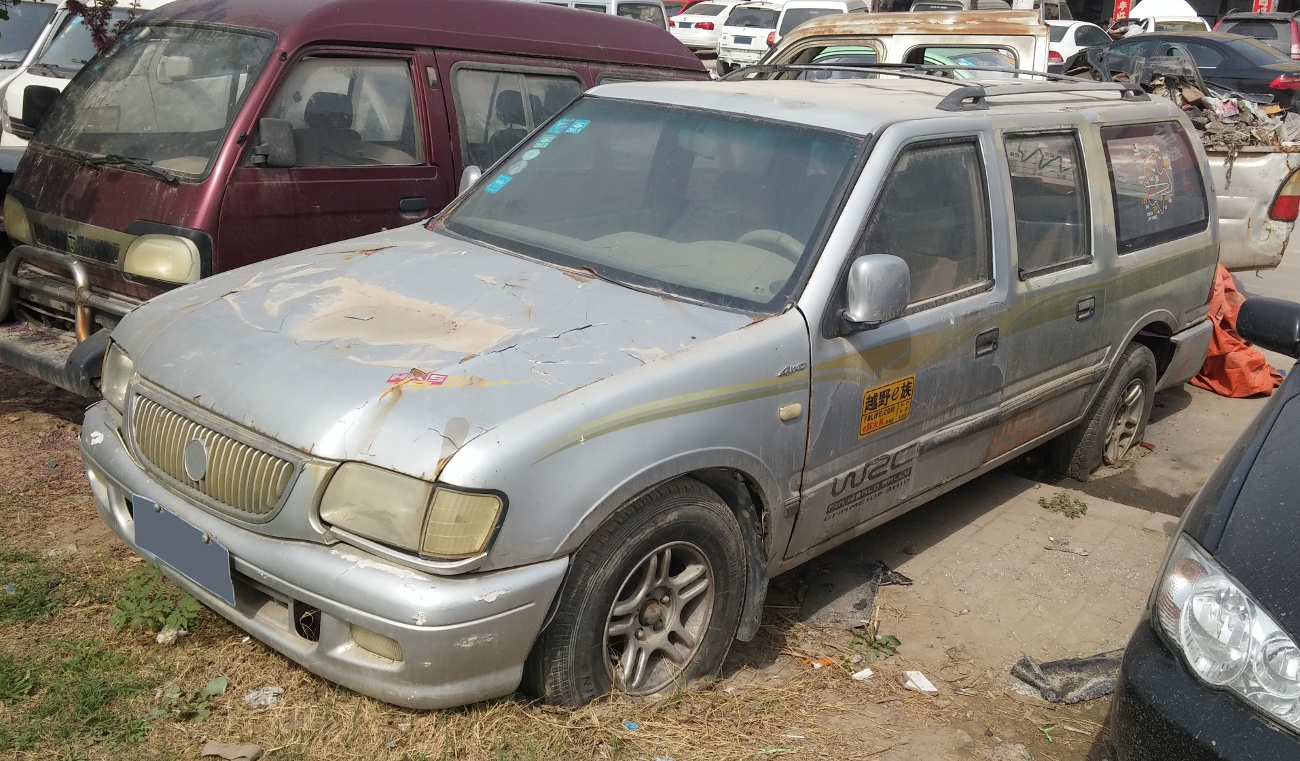
Wanfeng Suwei SHK6520

== Production ==
year	production number	source
2000	200	
2001	1260	
2002	1956	
2003	3356	

Note: The production number of 2003 refers only to SUVs. Additionally, 2445 pick-ups were created.
